This article shows the rosters of all participating teams at the women's indoor volleyball tournament at the 2012 Summer Olympics in London.

Pool A

The following is the Algerian roster in the women's volleyball tournament of the 2012 Summer Olympics.

Head coach:  George Strumilo

The following is the Dominican roster in the women's volleyball tournament of the 2012 Summer Olympics.

Head coach:  Marcos Kwiek

The following is the British roster in the women's volleyball tournament of the 2012 Summer Olympics.

Head coach: Audrey Cooper

The following is the Italian roster in the women's volleyball tournament of the 2012 Summer Olympics.

Head coach: Massimo Barbolini

The following is the Japanese roster in the women's volleyball tournament of the 2012 Summer Olympics.

Head coach: Masayoshi Manabe

The following is the Russian roster in the women's volleyball tournament of the 2012 Summer Olympics.

Head coach: Sergey Ovchinnikov

Pool B

The following is the Brazilian roster in the women's volleyball tournament of the 2012 Summer Olympics.

Head coach: José Roberto Guimarães

The following is the Chinese roster in the women's volleyball tournament of the 2012 Summer Olympics.

Head coach: Yu Juemin

The following is the Serbian roster in the women's volleyball tournament of the 2012 Summer Olympics.

Head coach: Zoran Terzić

The following is the Korean roster in the women's volleyball tournament of the 2012 Summer Olympics.

Head coach: Kim Hyung-sil

The following is the Turkish roster in the women's volleyball tournament of the 2012 Summer Olympics.

Head coach:  Marco Aurelio Motta

The following is the American roster in the women's volleyball tournament of the 2012 Summer Olympics.

Head coach:  Hugh McCutcheon

See also
Volleyball at the 2012 Summer Olympics – Men's team rosters

References

External links
Official website

2012
Women's team rosters
2012 in women's volleyball
Vol